Dov Lior (born 30 October 1933) is an Israeli Orthodox rabbi who served as the Chief Rabbi of Hebron and Kiryat Arba in the southern West Bank until late 2014. He is the rosh yeshiva of the Kiryat Arba Hesder Yeshiva and heads the "Council of Rabbis of Judea and Samaria". On multiple occasions he has called for ethnic cleansing of Arab Muslims  and has expressed support for mass murderers.

Biography
Dov Leinwand (later Lior) was born to a Belz Hasidic family, son to Moshe Leinwand, in Jarosław, western Galicia, Poland. During World War II, he fled the Nazis with his family to the Soviet Union. They went deep into Soviet territory, including Siberia and Kazakhstan, and suffered from hunger and disease. Both of his parents died. In 1944, he was placed in an orphanage for Polish citizens. In 1945, he arrived in Poland. Using a false identity, he managed to pass into the American occupation zone in Germany, where Jewish institutions operated. There, he reunited with an older brother who had served in the Red Army during the war, while another brother who was with him during the war joined the Hashomer Hatzair movement. Lior was placed in a Jewish children's home, where he began to study Hebrew.

In 1947, Lior was one of the passengers on the SS Exodus, which was intercepted by the Royal Navy after defying the British blockade of Palestine. He and the other refugees were deported by the British back to Germany. He eventually managed to reach Mandatory Palestine aboard the ship Negba, which arrived a few weeks before the establishment of the State of Israel. Once there, he changed his surname to the Hebrew Lior. In Israel, he first studied at the Bnei Akiva Kfar HaRoeh high school yeshiva, and then at Rabbi Zvi Yehuda Kook's Mercaz haRav yeshiva, where, owing to Lior's being an orphan, the Rabbi treated him like a son. He served in the Israel Defense Forces for one month in 1964.

Lior married Bitya Goldberger in 1960. She died of cancer in 1988. He later married Esther, widow of Rabbi Ephraim Shahor. Lior has 11 children, 55 grandchildren, and two great-grandchildren. His two brothers arrived in Israel after him, and joined the Hashomer Hatzair kibbutz HaMa'apil.

Rabbinic career
Lior is a Religious Zionist leader and student of Rabbi Zvi Yehuda Kook, son of Rabbi Abraham Isaac Kook. He served as Rabbi of Moshav Kfar Haroeh for 10 years. He subsequently became Chief Rabbi of Kiryat Arba. He serves along with Rav Eliezer Waldman as Head of the Hesder Yeshiva Nir Kiryat Arba. In 1978, he ran for the post of Chief Rabbi of Jerusalem, but was defeated 37-25 by Rav B. Zolti. He served as Av Beit Din of the Beersheva Rabbinical Court. One of his rulings, that Jews should be prepared to sacrifice their lives to defend the settlement of Hebron, has been interpreted as support for acts of suicide if the government tries to force evacuation. In the late 1980s, Israel's Attorney General barred Lior's almost certain election to the Supreme Rabbinical Council of Israel following a public outcry over his remark that captured Arab terrorists could be used as guinea pigs in medical experiments. After the Mercaz HaRav massacre, he said it was forbidden by Jewish law to employ or rent homes to Arabs.<ref name="haaretz.com">[http://www.haaretz.com/hasen/spages/966208.html Nadav Shragai, 'Top Yesha rabbi says Jewish law forbids renting houses to Arabs Haaretz 20/03/2008]</ref>

In 2008, Lior and other right-wing rabbis declared the government's policies on Israeli settlements to be "worse than the British Mandate's White Paper". Evaluating the Israeli invasion of Lebanon, Lior said it proved Israel was the one Middle Eastern state with sufficient military force to be considered a real power, a state all nations, willy nilly, must reckon with, and that "rooting out the iniquity (of the terrorists)" was "but a preliminary to the eventual rooting out of all evil in the world". According to Professor Uriel Simon, he is also reported to have said at a rally that, "(i)n order to prevent the death of one (Israeli) soldier, I am willing to destroy all of Beirut".

In 2009, he denounced the possible transfer of jurisdiction of Christian sites in Israel to the Holy See, saying it was "unthinkable to hand over to the Vatican any piece of our Holy Land". In 2011, he suggested that the Israeli government should offer incentives to the Bedouin to return to what he considered as their places of origin, Saudi Arabia and Libya.

In late 2014, Lior stepped down as chief rabbi. In  February 2015, he moved from Kiryat Arba to the Mount of Olives in Jerusalem.

Controversies
Lior has legitimized by a halakha ruling the killing of non-Jews during wartime. He asserted that Jewish women should not use sperm donated by a non-Jewish man, and that a baby born through such an insemination will have the "negative genetic traits that characterize non-Jews", and that, "If the father is not Jewish, what character traits could he have? Traits of cruelty, of barbarism."

In 2007, commenting on the situation of African refugees in Israel, Lior said that a much more important issue was the situation of Jewish settlers - whom he termed "refugees" - expelled from Gaza in 2005.

Leading rabbis have testified that Lior was the source of rulings labeling the late Prime Minister Yitzhak Rabin a "rodef" and a "moser" (a traitor who endangers Jewish lives). Rabin's assassin, Yigal Amir, is known to have visited Lior. Baruch Goldstein also met with Lior. After Goldstein murdered 29 Palestinian worshipers at the Cave of the Patriarchs, Lior described Goldstein as "as holy as the martyrs of the Holocaust".

In June 2011, Lior was arrested by Israeli police and questioned on suspicion of inciting violence for endorsing a religious book, the King's Torah'', that gives Jews permission to kill innocent non-Jews, including children. Lior had been summoned for questioning by authorities, but refused to appear. Spontaneous demonstrations erupted in and around Jerusalem as outraged supporters assembled in various parts of the city and on Route 1 to protest Lior's arrest. Israeli chief rabbis Yona Metzger and Shlomo Amar condemned the arrest as a "grave offense to an important rabbi's honor", and 25 members of the Knesset signed a petition denouncing it as "shameful" and as having been orchestrated by Deputy State Prosecutor Shai Nitzan. Lior was released after an hour of questioning.

Both opposition leader Tzipi Livni and Prime Minister Benjamin Netanyahu called for a full judicial investigation of Lior's remarks, and said that rabbis were not above the law.

In September 2011, Lior stated that Arabs are "evil camel riders".

In 2012, Lior referred to US President Barack Obama with what was possibly a racial slur, "kushi of the West"—which is akin to the modern pejorative use of the word negro in certain contexts—and likened him to the genocidal enemy of the Jews, Haman. He also compared Western European leaders to Nazi collaborators.

In July 2014, he said it was acceptable to kill Palestinian civilians and destroy the entire Gaza Strip in order to protect Jewish people in the South.

In November 2015, during a eulogy at a funeral in Jerusalem for a father and son killed in West Bank, Lior said of the Paris attacks: "The wicked ones in blood-soaked Europe deserve it for what they did to our people 70 years ago."

References

1933 births
Living people
Date of birth missing (living people)
Israeli Orthodox Jews
Israeli Orthodox rabbis
Israeli soldiers
Mercaz HaRav alumni
Religious Zionist Orthodox rabbis
Religious Zionist rosh yeshivas
Rabbis in Hebron
Rabbis in Jerusalem
Israeli Rosh yeshivas
Chardal
People from Kiryat Arba
People from Jarosław
Rabbis in Beersheba
Anti-Arabism in Israel